Scuba skills are skills required to dive safely using self-contained underwater breathing apparatus (scuba set). Most of these skills are relevant to both open-circuit scuba and rebreather scuba, and many are also relevant to surface-supplied diving. Certain scuba skills, which are critical to divers' safety, may require more practice than is provided during standard recreational training.

Some skills are generally accepted by recreational diver certification agencies as necessary for any scuba diver to be considered competent to dive without direct supervision. Others are more advanced, although some diver certification and accreditation organizations may consider some of these to also be essential for minimum acceptable entry-level competence. Divers are instructed and assessed on these skills during basic and advanced training and are expected to remain competent at their level of certification, either by practice or refresher courses. Many organizations recommend one of these options if a diver has a lapse of six to twelve months without a dive to qualify for more advanced activities or training.

Skill categories include selection, functional testing, preparation and transport of scuba equipment, dive planning, preparation for a dive, kitting up for the dive, water entry, descent, breathing underwater, monitoring the dive profile (depth, time, and decompression status), personal breathing gas management, situational awareness, communicating with the dive team, buoyancy and trim control, mobility in the water, ascent, emergency and rescue procedures, exit from the water, removal of equipment after the dive, cleaning and preparation of equipment for storage and recording the dive, within the scope of the diver's certification.

Basic open circuit equipment

Preparing and dressing in the diving suit

A certified scuba diver is expected to be able to assess what type of diving exposure suit is suitable for the planned dive, to check that it is in safe and usable condition, to check that it is the right size, and to dress correctly in it.  

Entry-level skills usually cover wet suits, but in countries where the water and/or weather conditions are cold, dry suit skills may be considered to be entry-level skills. Using a dry suit safely during dives requires special skills, including equalizing, buoyancy control, inversion recovery, emergency venting, and blowup recovery. Recreational divers trained in warm tropical waters may not acquire diving suit skills.

Preparing the equipment
Divers are personally responsible for the function of their equipment. When diving as buddies with other divers, they are expected to familiarize themselves with every aspect of the buddy's equipment with the purpose of being able to operate in an emergency.

Scuba assembly

Correct assembly and function are critical to the dive, and in some cases to the survival of the diver. All certification agencies require the diver to be competent to assemble their own set. 

Validating the function of the regulator, and inflation valve is part of scuba assembly, and reviewed as part of pre-dive checks. Considering that there is a significant interval between assembly and use, the check is commonly done twice.

Pre-dive checks

Pre-dive checks include equipment inspection and testing, and review of the dive plan with the dive team. Such checks can reveal problems that could make it necessary to abort the dive, including some which could be potentially fatal to the diver. 

Some pre-dive checks are done as part of donning the dive equipment. Establishing a routine for the order of donning and checking can help avoid skipping critical checks; a written checklist may be more reliable. The risk of skipping a check is increased if the process is disrupted, and it is good practice not to distract a diver unnecessarily during this process. The value of a written checklist increases with the complexity of the equipment used, and if there are distractions.

For a shore entry, kitting up may be broken up into stages, with the suit, scuba set and weights fitted at a convenient place and the mask and fins upon entering the water. In this case, some of the equipment may be checked both when it is donned and again just before committing to the water. If a long surface swim is necessary, the scuba set function and pressure may be checked again just before descent. 

Responsibility for pre-dive checks for professional divers is more complex, based on the duty of care, and is usually defined in an organizational operations manual, which may stipulate recorded checklists for the equipment in use and the participation of other diving team members.

Entry and exit

The certification requires one being able to get in and out of the water in a wide range of circumstances. Divers with disabilities or otherwise physically unable to make a safe entry or exit are expected to identify the conditions for which they need help, and to arrange for assistance, or to refrain from diving in those conditions.

The default condition for water entry is positive buoyancy, but negatively buoyant entry is appropriate in some circumstances, for example, given a strong surface current. Negative buoyancy is generally considered a higher-risk procedure. It requires the buoyancy compensator and dry suit to be deflated before entry, more precise control of weighting, confidence in the ability to equalize during rapid descent, and the ability to control descent rate and achieve neutral buoyancy without delay.  An acceptably safe negative entry requires pre-dive checks on the regulator and BC inflation function, and a sufficiently accurate balance of BC and/or suit inflation to ballast dive weights. This becomes more complex when large amounts of breathing gas are carried, as the weighting must allow neutral buoyancy at the shallowest decompression stop when the gas is expended, and the diver is therefore relatively more heavily weighted at the start of the dive.

Common entry and exit points include:
Poolside.
Small boat.
Large boat.
Beach or rocky shoreline.
Jetty or dockside.
Into/out of deep water.
Into/out of shallow water.
Surf line.

Entries
Standard water entries that are generally taught to entry-level divers include:
Stride entry: this is the standard method of entry from a standing position at a moderately low height above sufficiently deep water. The diver simply steps forward and remains upright during the short drop into the water. The fins strike the water first and reduce impact. Depth of immersion can be limited by performing a scissor kick immediately after striking the water. If an unexpected obstacle is present or the water is shallower than expected, the feet hit it first. The regulator and mask are vulnerable to water impact in this entry technique, so they are held in place with one hand. If the buoyancy compensator is inflated, the buoyancy and drag limit the depth of penetration. The diver may need to quickly clear the area below the entry point so that other divers can follow when there is a large group or a current.
Seated entry: sometimes also known as a controlled seated entry or silent entry. This technique is suitable from a platform where the diver can sit facing the water with the legs hanging into the water, like the side of a swimming pool, a floating jetty, or a swim platform on a large boat. It requires sufficient upper body strength to support the divers weight on the arms while rotating to face the platform, then lowering oneself into the water in a controlled manner. The diver sits at the waterside in full equipment with feet over the side in the water, places both hands palm down both on the deck on the same side of the body, and takes their weight on straight arms as they rotate their body to face the platform before lowering themselves into the water.
Backward roll: the backward roll entry is used from small boats where the diver completes the preparations to dive while seated on the side of the boat with their feet on the deck and the water behind them and is particularly suited to inflatable boats and other small, open vessels with a gunwale freeboard of about half a meter or less. Falling backward into the water from this position is relatively safe and easy, and can be done simultaneously by all the divers seated along the gunwale. The backward roll is suitable when the distance to the water is short, it is safe and comfortable to sit on the side deck, tube or gunwale and the diver will not rotate more than about 120° during the roll. It eliminates the need to stand up and walk to an alternative entry point on a moving platform while encumbered by equipment and can be done with back-mount or side-mount equipment. The back-mounted diving cylinder makes first contact with the water surface, and the more sensitive mask and demand valve, and any other sensitive equipment, are shielded from the initial impact by the diver's body. Care must be taken not to fall on divers already in the water. A multiple diver backward toll entry is usually coordinated by a crew person, who voices a count-down so all go at the same time. The more delicate and loosely fitted equipment should be held securely in place while rolling. In the case of sling or side-mount cylinders, these should be held in place by the arms to prevent them from hitting the diver in the face.
Forward roll: this is an alternative entry to the stride entry which can be used from a low to moderate height standing position. It is seldom used as the risk of injury, damage or loss of equipment is higher than for the stride entry, and rarely offers advantages. The technique is to stand at the edge of the deck, fully kitted, with the fins beyond the foot pocket overhanging the edge. The diver holds the mask and DV with one hand and bends forward at the hips, keeping the legs straight, curls in the head, and falls forward, rotating so that the top of the back-mounted cylinder strikes the water first.
Ladder descent: a ladder descent is a relatively controlled and low-impact entry method. Few ladders are suitable for descending while wearing fins, so they are usually carried over an arm or clipped to the diver, and put on once in the water. Putting fins on in the water can be tricky in a seaway or current, especially for less buoyant fins.
Surf and beach entries: these entries are complicated by breaking waves. A small break is not usually a problem, but a wave with sufficient energy to knock the diver over is usually best avoided by going under it if it cannot be avoided. The safe limit differs among divers and depends on the equipment used. Going under the break requires the mask and fins to be worn while the diver breathes through the regulator. It is easier to walk backwards through the broken wave if the fins are worn, and the type and height of the break can be important. A plunging breaker is much more difficult and dangerous than a spilling breaker for both entries and exits.
Entry from a steep rocky shore: depending on the details of the shoreline topography, water depth, and the wave action, the diver may be able to jump in fully kitted, sit at the water's edge to fit mask and fins, then slide or step in, or may have to climb down into the water and fit their fins in the water. Equally important are knowing how to time the entry to minimise the effects of waves, and knowing when entry is unacceptably risky. The skill and fitness of the diver, and the equipment in use all influence the risk, and must be considered.
Jump entries: jumps from heights of 3 m or more may be taught by some agencies. Relatively high jumps require the diver to strike the water upright with overlapped fins to reduce the risk of knocking them off, and to hold loose equipment in place, particularly the mask and demand valve. Demand valves should be desensitised where possible to reduce the risk of inducing a free-flow. High jump entries may be unsuitable for rebreathers, sidemount configurations or other configurations where a cylinder or other equipment is mounted in a way that may allow it to swing and strike the diver when it hits the water, or where the impact may damage equipment.

Negative entry
Negative entries are entries where the diver has negative buoyancy established before entering the water, allowing immediate descent, which can be useful when it is important to get below the surface as quickly as possible, in the presence of a strong surface current and a small descent target. This procedure requires all pre-dive checks to be done before entering the water, and the consequences of getting buoyancy settings wrong or neglecting a breathing gas setup check can be serious. Failing to connect inflator hoses, zip up a dry suit, or open the cylinder valve sufficiently can quickly lead to an emergency. Other problems can arise if the diver is too negative and has trouble equalising, or sinks so fast that the inflator valves cannot fill the dry suit or BCD fast enough to compensate for the compression of descent.

Exits
Standard exit procedures include:
Poolside.
Pool by ladder.
Small boat (over the side): heavy equipment is usually removed first and pulled onto the boat by a person onboard. Fins are commonly left on to help boost the diver out of the water. Depending on the height and shape of the boats topsides, the presence and type of handholds, and the skill and strength of the diver, it may be possible to climb out unaided, or may be necessary for one or more persons on the boat to help haul the diver in over the side.
Large boat (ladder): an exit by ladder may require the diver to remove their fins first. Fins may then be passed up to someone on the boat, clipped off to the diver, carried hanging over the wrists by the straps, or lifted on board in a net or basket or clipped to a rope with other gear. Depending on circumstances, such as the height of the climb and weight of equipment, the diver may remove other equipment and pass or send it up, or climb the ladder while wearing it. The procedure may be complicated by motion of the boat, waves, or current, as the diver may have difficulty getting back to the ladder if they drift away after removing their fins.
Jetty (steps or ladder).
Surf/beach exit.
Rocky shore exits.

Breathing from the demand valve
Breathing from a demand valve must be done correctly to make effective use of a limited air supply, and to avoid drowning. Most recreational scuba diving is done with a half mask, so the demand valve is held in the mouth, gripped by the teeth, and sealed by the lips. Over a long dive this can induce jaw fatigue, and for some people, a gag reflex. Various mouthpiece styles are available off the shelf or as customised items, and one of them may work better if either of these problems occurs. Air is inhaled and exhaled through the mouth, and the diver must be able to seal off the nasal passages from the pharynx so that breathing remains possible with a flooded or dislodged mask. Under most circumstances scuba breathing differs little from surface breathing. A full-face mask may allow the diver to breathe through the nose or mouth as preferred.

These factors make a slow and deep breathing cycle more energy efficient and more effective at carbon dioxide elimination. Part of the skill is learning to relax under water, part is to minimize effort by learning good buoyancy, trim, maneuvering and propulsion skills and part is to breathe more slowly and deeply. Breathing too slowly or too shallow does not ventilate the lungs sufficiently and risks hypercapnia (carbon dioxide buildup). Breathing effort increases with depth, as density and friction increase in proportion to the increase in pressure, with the limiting case where all the diver's available energy may be expended on the task, leaving none for other purposes. This may cause carbon dioxide buildup. If this cycle is not broken, panic and drowning may follow. The use of a low density inert gas, typically helium, in the breathing mixture can reduce this problem (as well as diluting the narcotic effects of the other gases).

Scuba divers are typically taught to not to hold their breath underwater, as in some circumstances this can result in lung overpressure injury. This is a risk only during ascent, as that is when air expands in the lungs. During ascent the airways must remain open. Holding the breath at constant depth for short periods with a normal lung volume is generally harmless, providing there is sufficient ventilation on average to prevent carbon dioxide buildup, and is a standard practice by underwater photographers to avoid startling their subjects. Breath holding during descent can eventually cause lung squeeze, and may allow the diver to miss warning signs of a breathing gas supply malfunction until it is too late to correct. 

Skilled open circuit divers make small adjustments to buoyancy by adjusting their average lung volume during the breathing cycle. This adjustment is generally in the order of a kilogram (corresponding to a litre of gas), and can be maintained for a moderate period, although it is more comfortable to adjust the volume of the buoyancy compensator over longer periods.

The practice of shallow breathing or skip breathing should be avoided as it may cause carbon dioxide buildup, which can result in headaches and a reduced capacity to recover from a breathing gas supply emergency. It is not an efficient method to conserve breathing gas. 

The skills appropriate to single and twin hose scuba regulators differ sufficiently to require relearning for a change from one to the other, but twin hose open circuit is obsolescent, and single hose skills are portable between models.

Demand valve clearing and recovery
Divers may remove their demand valves from their mouths under water for several reasons, both intentionally and unintentionally. In all cases, the casing may fill with water that must be removed before the diver can breathe again. This is known as clearing or purging the demand valve. The two clearing techniques for single hose regulators are:
Exhaling through the demand valve with the exhaust valve at the low point displaces the water with exhaled gas. Normal exhalation clears the demand valve with each exhalation provided that no parts of the internal volume are below the exhaust valve.
Blocking the mouthpiece (usually with the tongue) and pressing the purge button displaces the water with gas from the cylinder. If the exhaust valve is at the low point, the water will flow out through the valve. This method is more usual if the diver does not have sufficient breath left to clear by exhalation, as it consumes significant breathing gas, particularly when done frequently.

Divers may become nauseous and vomit underwater. Vomit left inside the DV must be cleared before breathing can resume. In this case it is usual to remove the DV from the mouth, flood it to rinse, and clear using the purge button. The process may be repeated as necessary. If the DV breathes wet after purging, something may be stuck in the exhaust valve. Flooding the DV and clearing again with the mouthpiece blocked usually clears the exhaust valve.

If the DV is dislodged from the diver's mouth unintentionally, it may end up in a place out of view of the diver. Three or more methods aid recovery:
The reach method, (or hose trace method), works in all cases where the DV is not snagged. The diver reaches back over the right shoulder to the hose feeding the DV, loops thumb and fingers round the hose, then slides the hand along the hose, pulling it forward and over the shoulder until the DV arrives in the right hand, after which it can be placed in the mouth.
The sweep method is quick and works in the common scenario in which the DV drops down on the diver's right side, while still draped over the right shoulder. In this situation the diver is usually between face down and upright, and sweeps the right hand across the waist from left to right, and around to the back, remaining in contact with the body or scuba set, and reaching as far back as possible, then straightens the arm backwards and swings it around outwards and forwards in an arc until it is pointing forwards. This captures the hose, moving it where the left hand can find it by sweeping along the arm from the right hand to the neck. This method fails if the DV is on the left side of the cylinder.
The inversion method works best when the DV has swung over to the left side of the cylinder behind the diver's back. The diver simply rolls forward into a head down position with the body near vertical, and relies on gravity to bring the DV down to where it can be captured.

If the diver has difficulty locating the demand valve by these methods, the octopus DV or bailout set can be used in the interim. Occasionally the DV gets snagged in such a way that it cannot be easily recovered. In some cases it may be prudent to abort the dive and surface, but this may not be practicable and it may be necessary to remove the harness partially or completely to recover the primary, after which the harness can be readjusted. A dive buddy can usually find the DV easily. If the DV cannot be reached it is prudent to terminate the dive, as a free-flow could empty the cylinder in minutes.

Mask clearing

Water commonly leaks into the mask, which can interfere with clear vision, and the diver needs to flush the water. Reasons for leakage include poor fit, leaking through hair, facial muscle movement that causes temporary leaks, or impact of external objects against the mask. Most diving masks can fog up due to condensation on the inside of the faceplate. This is avoided by applying an anti-fog surfactant to the inner surface before the dive. Otherwise, the diver can deliberately flood it slightly to rinse off the droplets, and then clear the mask.

Half mask 
A half mask is not directly connected to the air supply. The only available source of air to displace the water is the diver's nose. The procedure involves exhaling through the nose into the mask until the water has been displaced by air. During this process, the air must be prevented from escaping at a high point, or the water will not be expelled. If the mask does not fit in such a way that the top of the skirt remains sealed, the diver must press the upper part against the face. A half mask is held in place by a single strap, which though generally reliable and easy to inspect, has been known to fail. The skills are portable between models.

Full-face mask 
Several types of full-face mask exist, and the procedure for clearing them depends on the construction. In models that use an internal mouthpiece, the procedure is the same as with a half mask. Others automatically drain through the exhaust port of the demand valve provided the water can get to it. Models that use an oral/nasal internal seal usually drain to the demand valve or an additional drain valve at a low point when the diver's face is roughly upright or face down, and these clear during normal breathing for small leaks, and may be cleared of major flooding by using the DV's purge button to fill the mask with air.

Buoyancy control, trim and stability

Buoyancy control

The diver needs to be able to establish three states of buoyancy at different stages of a dive, using weights and a buoyancy compensator to control buoyancy. In the water the diver adjusts the BC's volume to increase or decrease buoyancy, in response to various effects that alter the diver's overall density.
Negative buoyancy: to descend or settle on the bottom.
Neutral buoyancy: when the diver wants to remain at constant depth.
Positive buoyancy: when the diver wants to float on the surface. A small amount of positive buoyancy my be used to ascend, but it must be constantly and continuously monitored to ensure that ascent does not accelerate to an excessive rate.
To achieve negative buoyancy, divers may need to carry supplemental weight to counteract any excess buoyancy of the diver and buoyant equipment.

Neutral buoyancy matches the average density of the diver and equipment to that of the water. This is achieved by increasing the buoyancy when the diver is too heavy, usually by adding gas to the BC, or decreasing buoyancy when the diver is too buoyant, usually by venting gas from the BC. Any uncompensated change in depth from a position of neutrality accelerates the change, making buoyancy control a continuous procedure—the diving equivalent of balance, in a positive feedback environment.

It is always necessary to vent gas during ascent to maintain a neutral or moderate level of positive buoyancy and control the ascent. Similarly, during a descent, gas must be added to prevent a runaway descent.

Buoyancy control compensates for changes of volume of the diving suit with changes of depth, and changes of mass due to using up the breathing gas.

Trim

Diver trim is the orientation and posture of the body in the water, determined by the distribution of weight and buoyancy along the body as well as by the other forces acting on the diver. The stability and static trim of a scuba diver are important both at the surface and under water. Trim must be maintained under water at neutral buoyancy, while surface trim must be held at positive buoyancy.

When the BC is inflated at the surface to provide positive buoyancy, the centre of buoyancy and centre of gravity of the diver are generally different. The vertical and horizontal separation of these centroids determines the static trim. The diver can usually overcome the trimming moment of buoyancy, which requires directed effort. The diver can adjust trim to suit circumstances such as swimming face down or face up, or remaining vertical. The diver's centre of gravity is determined by the distribution of weight, and buoyancy is determined by the equipment in use, particularly supplemental weights and the buoyancy compensator, which can significantly influence the position of the centre of buoyancy as it is inflated and deflated. Stable trim implies that the centre of buoyancy is directly above the centre of gravity. Any horizontal offset generates a moment that rotates the diver until the equilibrium condition is restored.

In almost all cases, the centre of buoyancy with an inflated BC is nearer the head than the centre of gravity, and BCs are designed to provide this as the default condition, as an inverted diver floating at the surface is at risk of drowning. The offset in the forward/backward axis is quite frequently significant, and is usually the dominant factor in determining static trim. At the surface, it is generally undesirable to be trimmed strongly face down, but it is useful to be able to trim face down at will. Vertical trim is acceptable providing it can be overcome for swimming.

Underwater trim is the diver's attitude (orientation) in the water, in terms of balance and alignment with the direction of motion. The free-swimming diver may need to trim erect or inverted at times, but in general, a horizontal trim has advantages both for reduction of drag when swimming horizontally, and for observing the bottom. A slightly head down horizontal trim allows the diver to direct propulsive thrust from the fins directly to the rear, which minimizes disturbance of sediments on the bottom, and reduces the risk of striking delicate benthic organisms with the fins. A stable horizontal trim requires that diver's centre of gravity is directly below the centre of buoyancy (the centroid). Small errors can be compensated fairly easily, but large offsets may make it necessary for the diver to constantly exert significant effort towards maintaining the desired attitude. The position of the centre of buoyancy is largely beyond the control of the diver, though the  may be shifted in the harness by a small amount, and the volume of the BC has a large influence when inflated. Most of the control of trim available to the diver is in the positioning of ballast weights. Fine tuning of trim can be done by placing smaller weights along the length of the diver to bring the centre of gravity to the desired position.

Mobility and maneuvering

The scuba diver usually uses legs and fins to move in the water, occasionally walking on the bottom as required by  circumstances. Hands are occasionally used to grasp solid objects to remain in a position in a current, but are generally not used for propulsion and maneuvering by a competent diver, as they are often needed for other purposes while finning. Techniques for effective propulsion using fins include:
Flutter kick and modified flutter kick: flutter kick is the finning style most frequently used. In its basic form it resembles the flutter kick of surface swimmers, but slower and with a larger stroke to make effective use of the fins' large surface area. The modified flutter kick is done with bent knees, pushing water up and behind the diver to avoid stirring up sediment on the bottom.
Scissor kick: scissor kick is an asymmetrical stroke also known as split kick. It is similar to the side kick, but with the diver trimmed face downward. It combines characteristics of the flutter kick, in that the stroke is up and down, and the frog kick, in that most of the power is generated in the closing part of the stroke. At the surface the diver can use the same action rotated 90° as a side kick. It is a powerful thruster, but not very fast.
Frog kick and modified frog kick: the frog kick is like the swimming action of a frog or the kick used in breaststroke. Both legs operate together and produce thrust which is directed more consistently backwards than flutter kick, and is suitable for finning near a soft silty bottom as it is less likely to stir up silt and degrade visibility. The modified form is done with bent knees, and though less powerful, produces almost no down-thrust. It is often used in cave diving and wreck diving where silt out can cause dramatic loss in visibility and may compromise the divers' ability to exit the overhead environment.
Dolphin kick: feet are kept together and moved up and down. This is the only stroke possible with a monofin, and can be effective for the skilled practitioner. It is not good for precise maneuvering. Muscles of the back and abdomen are used.

Techniques for maneuvering using fins include:
Reverse, back, or backward kick is used to swim backwards along the main body axis. It is probably the most difficult finning technique, and is not suited to some styles of fin. The stroke starts with the legs extended backwards at full stretch, heels together and toes pointed . The power stroke involves flexing the feet to extend the fins sideways, feet splayed outwards as much as possible, close to right angles to the legs and pulling the fins towards the body by flexing the legs at the knees and hips in a motion that pulls the diver backwards. Part of the thrust is due to flow across the width of the fins, as they are swept outward and forward. The fins are then pointed backwards to reduce drag, heels moved together, and legs extended to the start position. Fairly stiff, wide bladed fins are reputed to be most suitable for this stroke, which generally produces little thrust for the effort expended, but is the only method  of finning which moves the diver backward. Reverse kick is an advanced skill.
Helicopter turn: rotation around a vertical axis. The diver bends the knees so that the fins are approximately in line with, but raised slightly above the body axis, and ankle movements are used to scull water sideways. The fin is rotated to maximise sideways projected area, then a combination of rotation of the lower leg and knee produces sideways thrust. The fin is feathered to reduce drag for the return stroke. Thrust away from the centerline is more effective for most divers.

Most of these skills are trivially portable between models, with the exception of back kick, which may not work with soft and flexible fins, and monofins, which do not work with finning techniques which require relative movement of the feet.

Ascents and descents

Ascent and descent are the phases of a dive where ambient pressure is changing, and this comes with hazards. Direct hazards include barotrauma, while indirect hazards include buoyancy instability and physiological effects of gas solubility changes, mainly the risk of bubble formation by supersaturated inert gas in body tissues, known as decompression sickness. The skill of equalization is essential to avoid injury during both activities.

Descent
Barotrauma of descent is caused by pressure differences between the increasing ambient pressure and the internal pressure of gas filled spaces of the diver's body and equipment. More complex, but also more straightforward in practice, is buoyancy control and descent rate. The diver must control descent rate by adjusting the buoyancy compensator and, if worn, the dry suit. The diver must be able to limit descent rate to match the ability to equalise, particularly the ears and sinuses, and must be able to stop the descent quickly without going into an uncontrolled ascent. In most cases the bottom provides a physical limit to descent, but this is not always the case, as in a wall dive or blue-water diving. A skilled diver can stop at the desired depth or distance above the bottom, adjust to neutral buoyancy, trim level, and be ready to proceed with the dive.

Ascent

Barotrauma of ascent is caused by the same pressure differences, but during ascent. The two organs most susceptible to barotraumas of ascent are the sinuses and lungs, although both normally equalise automatically during ascent. Problems may arise in the middle ear if the Eustachian tubes become blocked during the dive, and the lungs can be injured if the diver forcibly holds their breath during ascent, which can occur during an emergency free ascent. As lung over-expansion is potentially life-threatening, entry level diver training emphasises developing the practice of not holding breath while diving on scuba, and slow continuous exhalation during emergency ascents. Techniques for clearing blocked Eustachian tubes during ascent are also taught at entry level.

Uncontrolled ascent can increase risk of decompression sickness and lung over-expansion injury even when diving within the no-stop limits of the decompression tables. The skills of controlling buoyancy during ascent are included in all entry level training, but the criteria for competence vary among the certification agencies. Most agencies require the diver to be able to limit ascent rate and to be able to achieve neutral buoyancy at a specified depth during an ascent without significantly overshooting the target depth, while using only a depth gauge or dive computer as a reference to depth and ascent rate, but this is a skill that usually requires more practice than is provided in recreational entry level training. The skills involve venting the buoyancy compensator and dry suit at a rate that provides neutral or slight negative buoyancy at all stages of the ascent, or a slightly positive buoyancy to assist ascent at the desired rate, and neutral buoyancy when a stop is required. 

Most dry suits are fitted with an automatic dump valve, which can be adjusted to provide an approximately constant volume of gas in the suit, so the diver can concentrate on controlling ascent rate via the buoyancy compensator. These skills become critical when  decompression stops are required, and even divers with excellent buoyancy control make use of aids to reduce risk. Shot lines are used at all levels of diving, and are in common use during entry level training, as a visual aid to ascent rate and depth control, and as a fall-back physical aid. The skills of deploying and using surface marker buoys and decompression buoys are generally considered advanced skills for recreational divers, but may be considered entry level skills for professional divers.

Equalising

During ascent and descent, gas spaces in the diver and diving equipment experience pressure changes that cause the gas to expand or compress where possible, possibly damaging those pressurised spaces. Some spaces, such as the mask, release excess gas when the pressure breaks the seal to the face, but have to be equalised during compression to avert mask squeeze. Others, such as the buoyancy compensator bladder, expand until the over-pressure valve opens. The ears usually vent naturally through the Eustachian tubes, unless they are blocked. During descent they do not typically equalise automatically, and the diver must equalise deliberately.

Communications

Divers need to communicate underwater to co-ordinate their dive, to warn of hazards, to indicate items of interest and to signal distress.

Most professional diving equipment using full-face diving masks and diving helmets includes voice communication equipment, while recreational divers generally rely on hand signals and occasionally on light signals, touch signals and text written on a slate Through-water voice communications equipment is available for recreational diving, but requires full-face masks.

Rope signals can be used by a diver who is connected to another diver or tender by a rope or umbilical. A few codes using "pulls" and "bells" (short tugs, grouped in pairs) are partly standardised. These are mostly used as backup signals by professional divers should voice communications fail, but can be useful to recreational and particularly technical divers, who can use them on their surface marker buoy lines to signal to the surface support crew.

Hand signals are generally used when visibility allows. These signals are often also used by professional divers. A set of instructional hand signals is used during training. Recreational divers are expected to be familiar with the hand signals used by their certification agency. These have to a large extent been standardised internationally and are taught on entry level diving courses. A few additional hand signals are commonly used by technical divers.

Light signals are made using a dive light in dark places with reasonable visibility, although few have been standardised. A light can also be used to illuminate hand signals.

Emergency procedures 
Procedures for managing reasonably foreseeable emergencies have been developed and standardised, and are included in training when the scope of diving encompassed by the training programme may put the diver at risk of those emergencies, some of which are included in entry level training.

Loss of breathing gas 
The diver has a limited ability to survive without breathing gas. Any interruption of the supply for more than a few seconds constitutes a life-threatening emergency. The diver must be prepared to cope with any reasonably foreseeable loss. Temporary interruptions due to flooding or dislodging the demand valve are addressed by recovery and clearing of the demand valve. More extensive interruptions require other skills. Ending the dive with an emergency ascent is appropriate in some circumstances. Other solutions involve accessing an alternative gas supply, either from an alternative source carried by the diver, or from another diver.

Managing regulator malfunctions 

There are several ways a regulator can malfunction. Some can be managed to a greater or lesser extent by the diver, but others, like a burst hose are not recoverable during the dive, though on a manifolded twin or a single cylinder with dual regulators, some of the gas can be saved if the cylinder valve is closed in time. Divers should learn the skill appropriate to the equipment they plan to use, so that the best response is possible in case of a malfunction.
Free-flow can be managed by feather breathing (manual cylinder valve operation to control gas flow) if the cylinder valve is easily reached. This is usually limited to side or sling mounted cylinders.
Regulator icing is a problem in cold water, particularly with regulators not rated for cold water operation. Freezing of the water in contact with the first stage can lock the first stage open, initiating a free-flow which will further cool the regutator, The only way it can be stopped is to close the supply valve from the cylinder, at which point the diver must necessarily switch to an alternative regulator supplied by a different cylinder valve. A similar problem can occur with the second stage, and a heavy free flow will commonly cause icing of both stages even in water that is not particularly cold.
Water leaks and wet breathing are usually caused by damage to the second stage regulator exhaust valve, diaphragm, or mouthpiece. The diver should switch to alternative second stage if available, though careful breathing and placement of the tongue in the air path can minimise salt spray aspiration.
Gas leaks – Most leaks cannot be corrected underwater, and the diver should consider the risk of the leak getting worse, when deciding when to terminate the dive.
Excessive work of breathing – Some second stages can be adjusted to reduce breathing effort at depth, others cannot. The diver may have the option to switch to an alternative gas supply or alternative regulator, but should consider the consequences of the problem deteriorating further when deciding whether to terminate the dive.
Juddering, moaning and popping are signs of mechanical problems, some of which may get worse during the dive, but do not themselves constitute an emergency. Popping is usuially a sign of a slow first stage leak.

Emergency air sharing

Emergency air sharing may involve sharing a single demand valve, or one diver providing a  secondary air source to another. The gas may be from the same scuba set or from a separate cylinder. The preferred technique of air sharing is donation of a demand valve that is not needed by the donor.

The standard approach is "octopus donation" in which the buddy offers the secondary "octopus" demand valve to the diver in trouble, although this is not universal. A variation on this approach is for the buddy to offer their primary demand valve to the diver in trouble, while switching to the octopus. The reasoning is that this is more likely to calm a diver in trouble, as they will know that the gas will be appropriate for the depth.

Alternatively, two divers can share a single demand valve. This is known as buddy breathing. Buddy breathing is no longer taught as widely, although some groups still teach it. The standard buddy breathing technique is for the divers to alternately breathe from the demand valve, each taking two breaths, although since the receiver is likely to initially be out of breath, he/she may need a few more breaths at first to stabilise. 

Once air sharing has been established, the dive terminates, unless the underlying problem can be resolved. Assisted ascents using a secondary demand valve are simpler than buddy breathing ascents, the risk to both divers is lower, gas consumption may be less, and this skill is quicker to learn.

Emergency ascents  

An emergency ascent happens when no procedure allows a dive to continue safely. 

Emergency ascents are independent ascents, where a single diver manages the ascent alone, or is assisted by another diver, who provides gas, propulsion, buoyancy, or other assistance.

In an emergency ascent the diver initiates the ascent intentionally, and chooses the procedure. Ascents that are involuntary or unintentionally uncontrolled are classed as accidents.
In a buoyant ascent the diver is propelled by positive buoyancy.
In a controlled emergency swimming ascent (CESA) the ascent remains under control and is performed at a safe rate.
In an emergency swimming ascent (ESA) the diver swims to the surface at either negative or approximately neutral buoyancy.

Other forms of ascent which may be considered emergency ascents are:
In a tethered ascent, the diver controls the ascent rate by use of a ratchet reel with the line secured to the bottom. This may be used if weights have been lost at depth and it will not be possible to maintain neutral buoyancy throughout the ascent, and the diver has a decompression obligation. The line must be long enough to reach the surface, and may have to be abandoned. 
In a lost mask ascent, the diver surfaces without reading instruments. It may not be possible to accurately monitor depth, rate of ascent or decompression stops. Instead another diver can monitor the ascent, or the diver can use the dive computer's audible alarms to know when to slow down or a tangible indicator such as a DSMB line, shotline or anchor line can regulate the ascent. As a last resort, rising more slowly than the smallest exhaled bubbles is generally safe when decompression stops are not required. A technique for trapping an air bubble at an eye may be used to make occasional instrument checks. 
In a lost buoyancy ascent, the diver loses the ability to establish neutral or positive buoyancy without dropping weights. This can be due to a buoyancy compensator failure or dry-suit flood.
Emergency ascent training policy differs considerably among the certification agencies, and has generated controversy regarding risk-benefit. Some agencies consider it irresponsible to fail to teach a skill which could allow a diver to safely manage a foreseeable emergency, others claim the probability of ever needing the skill to be low enough to disregard, and the risk of injury during training to be higher. Accident statistics are inconclusive.

Buoyancy compensator failure 
It may be necessary for the diver to establish positive buoyancy if the buoyancy compensator fails. The following methods are available:
A dry suit may be inflated. This increases the risk of inversion and an uncontrolled inverted ascent, so is less risky when done trimmed feet down. The automatic dump valve must be adjusted to retain more gas. This is a preferred method when available, as no equipment is abandoned, and full control of buoyancy is retained throughout the ascent. 
Weights may be dropped. Ideally only enough weight to establish neutral buoyancy, but this is not always possible. At the surface, more weight may be dropped at only the cost of the weights. If no weights can be dropped, it may become necessary to abandon the scuba set. This method is not reversible if too much weight is dropped. 
Some buoyancy compensators have a backup bladder, which may be inflated if the primary fails. However, if it is possible to unintentionally inflate the backup bladder, it may lead to a runaway buoyant ascent. 
A decompression buoy or lifting bag can be deployed on a reel line and the line used to control depth. There are hazards in deployment, but it is a standard procedure, and once the buoy is at the surface, the method allows excellent depth control if the buoy is big enough. The diver can control ascent by controlling the rate at which the line is wound back on the reel. A ratchet reel is preferable for this procedure, as it will not unwind under load unless the ratchet is released. It is necessary to keep the buoy inflated once the diver has surfaced unless another method for providing positive buoyancy is used.
Weights can be removed from the diver and fastened to the end of a reel line clipped to the diver, whereupon the diver lets out line to control rate of ascent. This is the same procedure used to control surfacing when weights are lost and the reel line is tied off to the bottom used in the CMAS self-sufficient diver qualification, but using the weights, which may be recovered later using the reel.

Buoyancy compensator blowup
Given a continuous gas leak into the buoyancy compensator, the diver can continuously dump excess gas while disconnecting the low pressure supply hose. If upright or trimmed even slightly heads-up, this usually allows gas to exit faster than it enters. The ability to disconnect the inflation hose under pressure is an important safety skill, as an uncontrolled buoyant ascent puts the diver at risk of lung overpressure injury, and depending on decompression obligation, at severe risk of decompression sickness. Once disconnected, the diver can neutralise buoyancy by oral inflation or further deflation. If using a full-face mask, the hose can be temporarily reconnected to add gas when needed.

Dry suit flooding

A dry suit leak can range from a trickle to a flood. Two aspects to a catastrophic flood put the diver at risk.

Damage to the lower part of the suit can admit cold water for winter divers, or contaminated water or chemicals for hazmat divers. This may not materially affect buoyancy, and the risk is mainly hypothermia or contamination. A normal ascent is typically feasible, but exiting the water may be difficult due to the weight of trapped water.

Damage to the upper part of the suit can cause a sudden gas venting, significantly or catastrophically reducing buoyancy and triggering uncontrolled descent and flooding. The buoyancy loss may exceed the buoyancy compensator's capacity. The simplest remedy is to drop sufficient weight to allow the buoyancy compensator to function effectively. This requires sufficient detachable weight. Some divers do not prepare for this contingency in their weight distribution, and such planning is not covered by all training standards. 

A flooded suit may hold so much water that the diver cannot exit the water because of the weight and inertia. It may be necessary to cut a small slit in the lower part of each flooded leg to drain the water.

Dry suit blowup

The possible consequences of a dry suit blowup are similar to a BCD blowup, and the method of management fairly similar. The instinctive reaction of trying to swim downwards is usually counterproductive, as it will prevent the automatic dump valve from releasing excess gas, while at the same time inflating the suit legs, making it difficult to fin, and if the boots slip off, impossible to fin. The diver must ensure that the dump valve is fully open, at the high point of the suit, and urgently disconnect the inflation hose. Many suits will release air at the neck or cuff seal if those are the highest point of the suit. It may be necessary to descend after this to compensate for rapid ascent, and to do this it may be necessary to dump gas from the BCD. After achieving neutral buoyancy, a normal ascent is usually possible, as it is seldom necessary to add air to the suit during ascent. The type of inflation hose connection can make a large difference to the urgency of the situation. The CEJN connector allows a much faster gas flow than the Seatec quick-disconnect fitting, and the Seatec is considered safer by the DIR community for this reason.

Manifolded twins

One of the standardised configurations used with manifolded twins was developed by the Doing It Right movement for cave exploration. The procedures are in general use by a many technical divers. The diver normally breathes from the right side primary second-stage regulator, mounted on a long hose which is tucked under at the waist and looped behind the head for quick deployment. A secondary second-stage regulator is carried just beneath the chin, suspended by a breakaway elastic loop around the neck, and supplied from the left side first stage cylinder by a shorter hose. The cylinder valves and manifold isolation valve are normally open:
Should another diver experience an out-of-air emergency, the donor diver offers the primary regulator, because it is known to be working correctly. The donor then switches to the secondary regulator. The entire gas supply is available to both divers. The primary hoses are long enough that they are able to separate by a sufficient distance to pass through tight restrictions with the donor ahead of the recipient.
If the primary regulator malfunctions, the diver closes the right-shoulder cylinder valve and switches to the secondary regulator. The entire gas supply remains available.
If the secondary regulator malfunctions, the diver closes the left-shoulder cylinder valve, continuing to breathe through the primary regulator. The entire gas supply remains available.
Cylinder to manifold connection malfunction can result in violent gas loss. Should the right side manifold connection leak, the diver closes the isolating valve to secure the gas in the left cylinder, and continues to use the gas from the right cylinder, switching to the secondary regulator if needed. At least half of the remaining gas volume is available once the isolation valve has been closed.
Should the left side manifold connection leak, the diver closes the isolating valve and switches to the secondary regulator to use the gas in the left cylinder while possible, switching back to the primary regulator after the secondary is exhausted. At least half of the remaining gas is available once the isolation valve has been closed.

Dive management skills
These are the skills of following the dive plan when undesirable events are avoided. They include planning and monitoring the dive profile, gas usage and decompression, navigation, communication, and modifying the plan to suit actual circumstances.

Monitoring depth and time, and decompression status
Whenever a dive may require decompression stops, it is necessary to monitor dive depth and duration to ensure that appropriate decompression procedures are followed if necessary. This process may be automated via a dive computer, in which case the diver must understand how to read the output and respond correctly to the information displayed, and for more complex dive plans, to input the appropriate settings. The display and operation of dive computers is not standardised, so the diver must learn to operate the specific model of computer. Accurate monitoring of depth and time is particularly important when diving using a schedule requiring decompression according to decompression tables, when a diving watch and depth gauge are used.

Undertaking dives with obligatory Decompression stops requires the diver to follow the appropriate decompression profile. This requires the ability to maintain depth for the necessary interval and to ascend at the correct rate. Ideally the diver should be able to do this without a static reference, referring only to instrument displays, but a decompression buoy or shotline may be used to indicate appropriate stopping points, thereby reducing the associated risk. Decompression stops are considered an advanced skill for recreational divers, but may be considered a basic skill for professional divers. Recreational divers are required to be able to avoid incurring a staged decompression obligation as a basic skill.

Breathing gas management

Management of breathing gas during the dive is a critical skill to avoid potentially fatal consequences. For the basic case of no-decompression open-water diving, which allows a free emergency ascent, this requires ensuring sufficient air remains for a safe ascent (plus a contingency reserve) and for the possibility of an assisted ascent, where the diver shares air with another diver. Gas management becomes more complex when solo diving, decompression diving, penetration diving, or diving with more than one gas mixture.

A submersible pressure gauge is used to indicate the remaining gas pressure in each diving cylinder. The amount of available gas remaining can be calculated from the pressure, the cylinder internal volume, and the planned reserve allowance. The time that he diver can dive on the available gas depends on the depth, gas mixture, work load, and the fitness of the diver. Breathing rates can vary considerably, and estimates are largely derived from experience. Conservative estimates are generally used for planning purposes. The diver must turn the dive and start the exit and ascent while there is enough gas to surface safely.

Navigation 

The two basic aspects of scuba navigation are surface navigation to find the dive site, and underwater navigation, to find specific places underwater and to reach the ascent point.

Underwater navigation includes observing natural features, operating a compass, estimating distance travelled, and distance lines, used to navigate underwater. Basic navigation is normally taught as part of entry level certification. Advanced underwater navigation is usually part of advanced recreational diver training.

Use of auxiliary equipment
These are generally considered advanced techniques for recreational divers, but basic skills for professional divers.
Bailout to a redundant gas supply: switching to a bailout cylinder in case of main gas supply failure. Techniques depend on how the cylinder is carried and mask type.
Control of line tension is important to prevent entanglement and snags.
Decompression buoys: inflatable buoys allow the diver to signal that the ascent has begun, and indicate the position of the diver to people on the surface, often the boat crew who recover the divers  after the dive. Deployment skills include controlled inflation, paying out line while avoiding snags and jams, maintaining appropriate depth control during deployment and control of line tension during ascent.
Distance lines: line carried on a reel or spool and laid out as a guide for the return. 
Shot lines: shot lines are used to allow divers to follow the line and reach the bottom at the right place, and ascend to the surface where the surface crew expects them. The choice, rigging and deployment of shotlines to suit the dive profile and environmental conditions is another skill.
Nitrox diving: the safe use of nitrox mixtures depends on remaining at depths where the partial pressure of oxygen is within acceptable limits, which requires knowledge of the oxygen fraction, which is necessary to calculate the maximum operating depth.
Switching gases for accelerated decompression: this requires positive identification of the appropriate breathing gas in use at any time, as decompression mixtures are typically dangerous to breathe at maximum depth of the dive.
Helium based breathing gases (trimix and heliox): these gases are used to reduce nitrogen narcosis at greater depths, and advanced skills of dive planning, gas switching, dive monitoring and decompression are needed. This is considered advanced skill for both professional and recreational diving.
s and s: the use of a lifeline is a team skill. The diver's line tender controls the deployment and recovery of the line, and ensures that slack is kept to a minimum. The diver informs the tender by line signals when to let out more line and when to pull in line, and must avoid getting the line snagged on underwater obstacles, or inadvertently passing under things which may prevent direct ascent to the surface. Buddy lines may be used to prevent buddy separation in darkness or low visibility. The divers mus be able to release the line at their own end in an emergency, and must avoid getting it snagged on underwater obstacles.

Logging the dive

The diver's log is a record of the diving experience of the owner, and professional divers are required to keep theirs up to date and correctly filled in. This requires the diver to take note of the data required in terms of the logbook data sheets, and fill it in correctly. It is usually required for the diving supervisor to countersign each page of a professional diver's logbook to maintain the it as a legal document. Recreational logbooks are generally not required outside of training, but are recommended as a record of experience, which may be inspected by a service provider as evidence of experience when applying to take further training or participate in dives requiring specific experience. Electronic logs are becoming more popular as the later generation dive computers will download the dive data they collect automatically in a reasonably user-friendly format. Some information must be input by the user, such as the venue, dive buddy and what was seen and done on the dive.

Diver rescue

Diver rescue is the process of avoiding or reducing further exposure to diving hazards and bringing a compromised diver to safety, such as a boat or shore, where first aid can be administered and additional medical treatment is available. Rescue skills are considered by some agencies to be beyond the scope of entry level divers, while others consider them entry level diving skills required as part of the professional skill set for a stand-by diver. 

Diver rescue skills include:
Controlled buoyant lift – a technique used to safely raise an incapacitated diver to the surface.
Making the diver buoyant on the surface.
Attracting help.
Towing a diver on the surface.
Landing the diver.
In-water artificial respiration.
CPR.
Oxygen first aid.
General first aid.
More than one technique may be taught for some of these skills.

Dry suits 
Skills necessary for the safe use of dry suits include:
Choosing a suit of appropriate size and fit. The suit should allow freedom of movement to work and reach all necessary accessories, valves etc. when worn over suitable undergarments. The seals should be tight enough to seal reliably, but not so tight as to restrict blood flow, particularly the neck seal.
Selecting appropriate undergarments for the water temperature. Undergarments should provide appropriate insulation for the water temperature, fit the diver without constraining movement, fit under the suit comfortably, and provide sufficient insulation in case of a major leak to allow the diver to safely ascend and exit the water.
Inspection of the suit for damage and defects before the dive, zip lubrication, and a check of seal condition.
Putting the suit on without damaging the wrist and neck seals, using a suitable lubricant if applicable, and adjusting the seals to lie smoothly on the skin of the neck and wrists, without folds or leak paths caused by hair or clothing.
Closing the zip correctly to avoid damage or leaks. A smooth pull while supporting the zip, and ensuring that the zip does not snag on ta fold of the suit, undergarments or hair. The sealing surfaces must be free of any contamination which could cause the zip to jam, dislocate or leak.
Removing excess gas after putting on the suit. Usually done by opening the dump valve and squatting down, hugging the knees to compress the suit as much as possible.
Choosing and distributing ballast weight to provide correct trim and buoyancy at the start and end of the dive.
Maintaining an appropriate gas volume in the suit during the dive to avoid suit squeeze or large bubbles of excess air.
Buoyancy control during descent, at constant depth, and during ascent, by adding gas when needed via the inflator valve, and dumping excess, usually by keeping the dump valve high and adjusted correctly.
Inflation and dumping excess gas - setting the auto-dump valve. A correctly set auto-dump valve will seldom require adjustment during ascent.
Maintaining appropriate trim and attitude underwater and at the surface. To a large extent this depends on correct weighting and weight distribution.
Undressing from the suit without damaging zip or seals. Withdrawing the hands through the wrist seals can take some practice. This is a time when seals are easily damaged. A lubricant that does not harm the seal can help.
Post dive cleaning and maintenance.
Managing contingencies:
Connecting and disconnecting a pressurised inflator hose: It is possible, with a little effort, to connect an inflator hose under pressure, as long as the locking balls are free to retract and the locking ring has been slid back to release the balls. It just requires being pushed on far enough that the locking system engages. However, in rare cases the hose end is not entirely compatible with the nipple on the valve, and the incompatible combinations will not connect regardless of whether they are pressurised, so it is important that compatibility is checked on hired or new equipment. If the dry-suit and buoyancy compensator use the same connector, they can be swapped out if one malfunctions. Buoyancy compemsators have an oral inflation option, so if the dry-suit inflator hose does not supply air for any reason during a dive the BC hose can be used, and it will  normally be swapped out under pressure, so the cylinder valves do not have to be closed and regulators purged for the swap, which is likely to leave the diver without breathing gas while making the swap. When a hose is connected underwater a small amount of water will be trapped in the connector and blown into the suit when the valve is operated. This is minor issue.
Managing a stuck inflation valve: Inflation valves are quite simple, but can jam open or closed. If the valve jams open and a few pushed don't loosen it up, it will be necessary to disconnect the inflator hose or constantly dump gas from the suit.Depending on the leak flow rate either of these options may work, though a disconnection will usually be safer, and it should not be necessary to add gas to the suit during ascent.
Recovery from inversion.
Recovery from uncontrolled buoyant ascent/blowup.
Managing a leak or flood.

Rebreather 

Rebreather skills are necessary when using a rebreather for recreational or technical diving. Due to the technical complexity of mixed gas rebreather design and construction, and the significantly larger number of possible failure modes compared with open circuit diving, the skill set required is more complex and generally requires more training and practice to master. As with most diving equipment, there are preparation skills, in-water standard operating skills, emergency skills and after use maintenance skills involved, all of which may have details specific to the model of rebreather in ise, though there are common principles involved.
Preparing the rebreather: parts of the rebreather may require assembly before use, after which it must be tested for correct function. The scrubber canister must be filled with the correct amount of absorbent material. Positive and negative pressure tests are typically conducted. The positive pressure test ensures that the unit does not lose gas while in use, and the negative pressure test ensures that water does not leak into the breathing loop where it can degrade the scrubber medium or the oxygen sensors.
Prebreathing the unit (usually for about 3 minutes) shortly before entering the water ensures that the scrubber material warms to operating temperature, and in closed circuit rebreathers, that the partial pressure of oxygen is controlled correctly.
Correct weighting, trim and buoyancy control (different from open circuit).
Ascents and descents.
Monitoring oxygen partial pressure: partial pressure is of critical importance on CCR's and is monitored at frequent intervals, particularly during descent, where oxygen toxicity is possible, and ascent, where the risk of hypoxia is highest.
Monitoring carbon dioxide level: carbon dioxide buildup is a hazard, and most rebreathers do not provide CO2 monitoring. The diver must watch for indications.
Mask clearing and dive/surface valve draining.
Switching to alternative gas supply: bailout to open circuit is generally considered a good option given any uncertainty about the problem or whether it can be solved. The bailout procedure depends on rebreather details and the bailout equipment. Methods include:
Switch the mouthpiece bailout valve to open circuit.
Open a bailout demand valve already connected to the full face mask, or by nose-breathing, where applicable.
Close and exchange the rebreather mouthpiece for a separate demand valve.
Close the mouthpiece and switch to the mouthpiece of another rebreather.
Bailout ascent: unless the problem can be corrected quickly and reliably, bailout requires aborting the dive.
Diluent flush: many diver training organizations teach the "diluent flush" technique as a safe way to restore the mix to an appropriate level of oxygen. It works only when partial pressure of oxygen in the diluent would not cause hypoxia or hyperoxia, such as when using a normoxic diluent and observing the diluent's maximum operating depth. The technique involves simultaneously venting the loop and injecting diluent. This flushes out the old mix and replaces it with a known proportion of oxygen.
Drain the loop: regardless of whether the particular rebreather has the facility to trap water, it may be necessary to remove excess water from the loop.
After-dive maintenance. Stripping, cleaning and preparation for storage.

Special applications

Special applications require additional skills. In many cases such skills can be shared across applications, with only a few specific to that application. Many underwater work and activity skills are not directly related to the use of scuba equipment.

Example applications:
. The skills of monitoring gas use, and monitoring and control of ascent rate are critical for decompression safety. In open water the use of a decompression buoy to control depth during ascent can significantly reduce risk of accidentally violating decompression obligations.
. It is often critical to diver safety to use the correct gas mixture for the current dive depth when several are carried, and the mixture used can make a large difference to decompression obligation.
. Multiple cylinders may be used to carry a larger supply of gas to extend  possible dive duration, or to provide breathing gas appropriate to the depth and for accelerated decompression. The diver must be aware of which mixture is appropriate and which is in use, and be able to make the correct adjustments to decompression procedure to suit the gases.
. In penetration diving the most important specialist skill is the use of guide lines for navigation, to ensure that the divers can find their way out from under the overhead and surface without running out of breathing gas.
.
.
.
.
.
.
.
.

Training, assessment and certification

Scuba skills training is primarily provided by practical instruction directed by a registered or certified diving instructor. Additional practice and skills maintenance are the diver's responsibility. Recreational divers may attend refresher courses, which may involve revisions to earlier practices. Service providers such as dive shops and charter boats may require a checkout dive for divers unfamiliar with the region, or who haven't dived for some time. The checkout dive allows the diver to demonstrate basic skills relevant to the expected conditions.

It is the individual diver's responsibility to maintain sufficient skill and fitness to dive safely and not endanger themselves or others, and to judge whether they are ready to handle the anticipated conditions.

Recreational diver training

Many recreational diver training organizations offer diver training. Successful completion is shown by the issuance of a "diving certification", also known as a "C-card", or qualification card.

Recreational diver training courses range from minor specialties which require one classroom session and an open water dive, and which may be completed in a day, to complex specialties which may take days to weeks, and require classroom sessions, confined water skills training and practice, and an open-water dives, followed by assessment of knowledge and skills. Accurate schedules are generally only available from the specific school or instructor who presents that course, as this will depend on local conditions and other constraints.

The initial open water training for a person who is medically fit to dive and a reasonably competent swimmer is relatively short. Many dive shops in popular holiday locations offer courses intended to teach a novice to dive in a few days, which can be combined with diving on the vacation. Other instructors and dive schools provide longer and more thorough training.

Diving instructors affiliated to a diving certification agency may work independently, or through a university, a dive club, a dive school or a dive shop.  They offer courses that satisfy the standards of a certification organization.

Technical diver training
Technical diver training generally follows a similar pattern to recreational training, but provides more theoretical information, and in many cases, an exhaustive level of skill training, with higher standards for assessment, as the risks are higher and the necessary competence to manage reasonably foreseeable contingencies is more complex.

Professional diver training

Professional diver training is typically provided by schools affiliated to or approved by one or more commercial, scientific or other professional diver certification or registration organisations  Professional diver training standards require significantly higher skill level than recreational certification. The professional diver is expected to manage most contingencies and still perform the planned work under difficult conditions. Professional training may include confidence training or stress training, where simulated emergencies are enacted, or unlikely contingencies are simulated, to develop the diver's confidence in their ability to safely manage contingencies. The amount of time spent on skill and confidence development is generally proportional to the length of the training programme, as basic skills are usually learned fairly quickly.

Skills retention 
 
Although many scuba skills are safety critical, most are straightforward and are easily retained once learned, given occasional practice. The routine skills that are exercised on most dives or every dive are usually well retained, but emergency skills may be seldom practiced outside of the training environment, and are consequently often poorly retained and inadequate in the face of a real emergency. Even in the training environment they are not often overlearned to the point of integrating with the divers muscle memory. In many cases it is likely that if an emergency occurs during a dive under stressful conditions, the diver will be unable to manage the challenge safely. Refresher training is recommended by some training agencies when the diver has not dived for an arbitrary period of time, such as six months, but the actual need for relearning is not so easily identified, and checkout dives are a common requirement of service providers for divers without a convincing logbook showing recent appropriate experience.

References

See also
 
 

Underwater diving procedures